The Chernobyl disaster, considered the worst nuclear disaster in history, occurred on 26 April 1986 at the Chernobyl Nuclear Power Plant in the Ukrainian Soviet Socialist Republic, then part of the Soviet Union, now in Ukraine. From 1986 onward, the total death toll of the disaster has lacked consensus; as peer-reviewed medical journal The Lancet and other sources have noted, it remains contested. There is consensus that a total of approximately 30 people died  from immediate blast trauma and acute radiation syndrome (ARS) in the seconds to months after the disaster, respectively, with 60 in total in the decades since, inclusive of later radiation induced cancer. However, there is considerable debate concerning the accurate number of projected deaths that have yet to occur due to the disaster's long-term health effects; long-term death estimates range from up to 4,000 (per the 2005 and 2006 conclusions of a joint consortium of the United Nations) for the most exposed people of Ukraine, Belarus, and Russia, to 16,000 cases in total for all those exposed on the entire continent of Europe, with figures as high as 60,000 when including the relatively minor effects around the globe. Such numbers are based on the heavily contested linear no-threshold model.

This no-threshold epidemiology problem is not unique to Chernobyl, and similarly hinders attempts to estimate low level radon pollution, air pollution and natural sunlight exposures. Determining the elevated risk or total number of deaths from very low doses is completely subjective, and while much higher values would be detectable, lower values are outside the statistically significant reach of empirical science and are expected to remain unknowable.

From model-based epidemiological studies, the incidence of thyroid cancer cases due to the accident by 2065 compared with other cancer-inducing sources (diet etc.) across Europe, is roughly 1 in 10,000 as a probable worst-case scenario. Thyroid cancer is relatively amenable to treatment for several decades.  Attributing a 1% mortality rate by Tuttle et al. to the 16,000 cases across Europe as predicted by Cardis et al. results in a likely final total death toll from radiation-induced thyroid cancer of around 160.

There have been no validated increases in solid cancer reported from the liquidator cohorts. The liquidators were adult at exposure and the vast majority of them received doses under 100 mSv, which is lower than many expect.

Note also that a paper in Science states there is no transgenerational effect of radiation in children born of those working as liquidators. This study used whole genome sequencing in a cohort of parent and child blood samples.

Differing direct, short-term death toll counts 
Initially, the Soviet Union's toll of deaths directly caused by the Chernobyl disaster included only the two Chernobyl Nuclear Power Plant workers killed in the immediate aftermath of the explosion of the plant's reactor. However, by late 1986, Soviet officials updated the official count to 30, reflecting the deaths of 28 additional plant workers and first responders in the months after the accident. In the decades since the accident, many former Soviet officials and some Western sources had also determined a total of 30 direct casualties.

For their part, some surviving evacuees of regions now included in the Chernobyl Exclusion Zone and the Polesie State Radioecological Reserve argue that the official toll of the accident's direct casualties excludes trauma and ARS deaths that they themselves claim to have witnessed in the weeks and months after the reactor explosion. In response, constituent agencies of the United Nations—including the United Nations' International Atomic Energy Agency (IAEA) and the Chernobyl Forum—discount such evacuee claims as misinformation, "urban legends", or radiophobia.

2005 and 2006 UN reports debate 
In August 1986—at the first international conference on the Chernobyl disaster—the IAEA established but did not make official a figure of 4,000 deaths as the total number of projected deaths caused by the accident over the long term. In 2005 and 2006, a joint group of the United Nations and the governments of Ukraine, Belarus, and Russia—acknowledging the ongoing scientific, medical, social scientific, and public questioning of the accident's death toll that had emerged over the then-20 years since the disaster—worked to establish international consensus on the effects of the accident via a series of reports that collated 20 years of research to make official previous UN, IAEA, and World Health Organization (WHO) estimates of a total 4,000 deaths due to disaster-related illnesses in "the higher-exposed Chernobyl populations".

However—as an April 2006 special report in the peer-reviewed, scientific journal Nature detailed in response—the accuracy and precision of this United Nations-led joint group's projected death toll of 4,000 were immediately contested, with several of the very scientists, physicians, and biomedical consortia whose work the joint group had cited alleging publicly that the joint group had either misrepresented their work or interpreted it out of context.

Others have also found fault with the United Nations-led joint group's findings in the years since their initial publication, arguing that the 4,000 figure is too low—including the Union of Concerned Scientists; surviving Chernobyl liquidators; evacuees of Chernobyl, Pripyat, and other areas now included in the Chernobyl Exclusion Zone and the Polesie State Radioecological Reserve; environmental groups like Greenpeace; and several of the Ukrainian and Belarusian scientists and physicians who have studied and treated relocated evacuees and liquidators over the decades since the accident.

Liquidator mortality 

The uncertain and contested mortality rate of the Chernobyl liquidators is a major factor in the lack of consensus on the Chernobyl disaster's accurate death toll. Following the disaster itself, the Soviet Union organized an effort to stabilize and seal off the reactor area, still awash in radiation, using the efforts of an estimated 600,000 "liquidators" recruited or conscripted from all over the Soviet Union.

Since the 1990s—when the declassification of selected liquidator records prompted some direct participants to speak publicly—some with direct involvement in the liquidators' cleanup efforts have asserted that several thousand liquidators died as a result of the cleanup. Other organizations claim that total liquidator deaths as a result of the cleanup operation may number at least 6,000.

The National Commission for Radiation Protection of Ukraine disputed the 6,000 estimate as much too high, maintaining that a Chernobyl-cleanup-related death toll of 6,000 would outstrip confirmed liquidator deaths from all other causes—including old age and car crashes—during the period in question. In contrast, representatives of Kyiv's National Research Centre for Radiation Medicine, the Union of Chernobyl Liquidators, and the WHO's Radiation Protection Programme argue that both the perilous conditions in which the liquidators worked and the secrecy with which the Soviet Union shrouded the highly classified disaster cleanup efforts not only preclude dismissing a liquidator death toll of 6,000, but also indicate that the 6,000 estimate might be too low.

For their part, some surviving Chernobyl liquidators have argued publicly since the declassification of additional records in the early 2000s that official records and bureaucratic assessments do not reflect the full scope of liquidators' claims of disaster-related deaths. Examples of such claims include the comments of surviving liquidators in the Prix Italia-winning 2006 documentary, The Battle of Chernobyl, as well as Valeriy Starodumov's comments in the 2011 Ukrainian documentary Chornobyl.3828, which chronicles Starodumov's, and other liquidators' work and posits its long-term effects on their lives and health.

Long-latency diseases 
Issues related to identifying and tracking long-latency diseases have presented another stumbling block to reaching consensus on deaths beyond the immediate fatalities directly attributable to the initial reactor explosion and subsequent ARS. In the years since the accident, delayed, post-disaster deaths due to solid cancers, leukemia, and other long-latency diseases that might be attributable to the accident's release of radioactive debris have remained an ongoing concern. However, the streamlined standards, methods, and sustained research efforts needed to pinpoint, track, and tally such long-latency disease deaths have remained lacking—resulting in gaps in data and divergent estimates. There is consensus for only one form of long-term physiological effect: thyroid cancer in those who consumed radioactive iodine as children. This is because doses of radioiodine to the child's thyroid were much higher than other isotopes and the child's thyroid is still growing. Of those in the exposed cohort who have developed thyroid cancers, the proportion of cancers attributable to the Chernobyl incident is estimated to be between 7% and 50%. As there is no bio-marker for radiation induced thyroid cancer, the exact number of cases seen in the population cannot be determined.

Addressing long-latency diseases in a widely cited 2008 report, the IAEA reaffirmed its August 1986 conclusion—initially reached at the first international conference on the accident (an event closed to the press and citizen observers) and made official in 2005 and 2006—of a projected 4,000 premature deaths as a result of the disaster. The IAEA based this 4,000 figure on its estimate of a 3% increase in cancers in the regions surrounding the plant, first adopting it at the 1986 conference after rejecting the finding of 40,000 projected deaths that Valery Legasov—inorganic chemist and a lead investigator of the Soviet Union's official Chernobyl disaster commission—had estimated based upon his team's research. In 2020, Hauptmann and many international scientists studying the numerous damages resulting from the "low doses" that have afflicted the populations of survivors of the explosions of the atomic bombs on Hiroshima and Nagasaki and also in numerous accidents of nuclear plants that have occurred in the world, concluded in an extensive meta-analysis that the new epidemiological studies directly support excess cancer risks from low-dose ionizing radiation; and Venturi has reported in Russian journal "Biosfera" a correlation between radioactive caesium and world increase of incidence and death for pancreatic cancer.

In compensation and payout legal terms, by 2005, the Ukrainian government  was providing survivors' benefits to 19,000 families "owing to the loss of a breadwinner whose death was deemed to possibly related to the Chernobyl accident;" by 2019, this figure had risen to 35,000 families. By 2016, some Ukrainian and Belarusian physicians charged with treating large numbers of former liquidators in the decades since the accident were calling for more comprehensive studies and urging that the IAEA's estimated toll of disaster-related deaths from long-latency diseases be revised upwards, claiming that their own data indicates a former liquidator death rate of several thousand per year as a result of diseases related to the disaster.

Greenpeace projected up to a million excess, cancer-related deaths from the Chernobyl disaster. The Chernobyl Forum, the WHO, and other international agencies do not accept this number.

Methodological debates 
The use of differing, contested methods to identify and tally deaths—including anticipated deaths due to long-latency diseases—has also contributed to the wide range of estimates of the Chernobyl disaster's death toll. As former IAEA head Hans Blix has recalled in interviews, such disagreement over various tabulation methods and the divergent death tolls that they yield has been a mainstay of efforts to estimate the disaster's total fatalities since international authorities' first attempts to establish a consensus death toll.

Indeed, at the August 1986 meeting of the first international conference on the disaster, the IAEA scaled down from 40,000 to 4,000 the projected disaster-related deaths estimate of Valery Legasov—inorganic chemist and a lead investigator of the Soviet Union's official commission—after objecting to Legasov's use of a statistical model based on radiation data from the atomic bombings of Hiroshima and Nagasaki. (It is this 4,000 figure from the 1986 conference's methodological debate that the IAEA cited as its rough estimate for 20 years before joining other United Nations agencies in 2005 and 2006 to make 4,000 the UN's official estimate of disaster-related deaths.) Similarly, some theoretical estimates of the disaster's deaths are disputed on the grounds that they rely upon contested models such as the linear no-threshold model (LNT) or hormesis in order to compare the disaster's estimated cancer rates to background rates of cancer.

Yet even estimated death tolls that have acknowledged and attempted to mitigate for such methodological debates have yielded a body of divergent estimates—including the Union of Concerned Scientists' 2011, LNT-model-based conclusion of 27,000 deaths due to the accident; the death toll of 93,000 to 200,000 that Greenpeace has posited since 2006; and Chernobyl: Consequences of the Catastrophe for People and the Environment (published in 2007 by Russian affiliates of the Annals of the New York Academy of Sciences, but without NYAS' explicit approval), which estimates 985,000 premature deaths as a result of the radioactivity the accident released.

Surviving evacuees' accounts 
Since 1986, officials have tended to discount as inaccurate, inexpert opinion the claims of some surviving Chernobyl Exclusion Zone and Polesie State Radioecological Reserve evacuees that their own observations of deaths attributable to the disaster are not reflected in official records and tallies. For example, authorities have long dismissed as 'urban legend' some Pripyat evacuees' claims of high death rates among fellow citizens who gathered on a railway bridge—the so-called 'Bridge of Death'—to watch the exploded reactor's blazing fire and glowing, electric blue column of ionized air in the midst of visible nuclear fallout on the night of the accident. This has never been substantiated, and at least one surviving witness has said they were on the bridge that night and are healthy.

Indeed, some authorities have argued that post-disaster psychological trauma—sometimes characterized as Radiophobia or labeled a mental aspect of the collection of post-accident symptoms that some physicians term 'Chernobyl Syndrome'—has led some former residents of the region surrounding the plant to attribute deaths to the accident based on anecdotal evidence alone. In this vein, the Chernobyl Forum, the World Nuclear Association (WNA), and other groups posit an increase in psychological problems among those exposed to the disaster's radiation, due in part to poor communication of radiation's effects, disruption to their way of life, and trauma surrounding the dissolution of the Soviet Union.

In response, some former residents of the region that now comprises the Chernobyl Exclusion Zone and Polesie State Radioecological Reserve—including Lyubov Sirota, a Ukrainian poet and Pripyat evacuee, in her 1995, Chernobyl Poems verse, "Radiophobia", and her 2013 memoir, The Pripyat Syndrome—decry such questioning of survivors' psychology and discernment as efforts to dismiss and de-legitimize both evacuees' claimed long-term experience of the disaster's lethal impacts and evacuees' allegations of the accident's tangible, ongoing effects upon their physical health. In her 1988 poem, "They Did Not Register Us (To Vasily Deomidovich Dubodel)", Sirota addressed what she considers the failure of local and international authorities to recognize the disaster-related, long-latency disease deaths of Chernobyl Exclusion Zone evacuees and to reach consensus about how best to tally and study these deaths. She wrote:

Still more controversially, some surviving Chernobyl Exclusion Zone and Polesie State Radioecological Reserve evacuees take particular issue with the longstanding position of constituent United Nations agencies to discount as misinformation, "urban legend", or radiophobia the claims of some evacuees that during the weeks and months directly after the accident, they witnessed more immediate disaster-related deaths due to trauma and radiation sickness that they argue are not reflected in the official record. For example, Nikolai Kalugin—an evacuee from a village now included in Belarus' Polesie State Radioecological Reserve—claimed to Newsweek in May 2019 that his daughter died in the weeks after the accident as the result of what he maintains were unrecorded local cases of radiation sickness:

For their part, the United Nations and some prominent Chernobyl disaster scholars continue to discount as mistaken or Radiophobic such evacuee claims of additional, short-term, direct deaths due to accident-attributable trauma or radiation sickness not counted in the official tallies of the accident's death toll.

Official list of direct deaths 
The 31 persons listed in the table below are those whose deaths the Soviet Union included in its official roster—released in the latter half of 1986—of casualties directly attributable to the disaster.

See also 
 Chernobyl: Consequences of the Catastrophe for People and the Environment
 Individual involvement in the Chernobyl disaster

Notes

References 

Aftermath of the Chernobyl disaster
Death in Ukraine
Chernobyl disaster